Deli Emir Ahmed Agha ("Emir Ahmed Agha the Mad"; died November 1753), later known as Seyyid Emir Ahmed Pasha, was an Ottoman statesman and military leader.

Raised as a member of the elite infantry unit, the Janissaries, he was its Agha (chief) from May 1750 to January 1751. Later, he served as the governor of the Sidon Eyalet (1751, 1752–53) and the Aleppo Eyalet (1751–52).

References

1753 deaths
18th-century people from the Ottoman Empire
Pashas
Governors of the Ottoman Empire
Janissaries
Year of birth unknown
Ottoman governors of Aleppo